Walter "Peck" Irvin Lerian (February 10, 1903 – October 22, 1929) was an American professional baseball player who played two seasons for the Philadelphia Phillies from  through .
He was born in Baltimore, Maryland and died there at the age of 26 when a truck leaped the curb and he was pinned against a building, ending what was considered at the time to be a promising major league career.

See also
 List of baseball players who died during their careers

References

External links

SABR Biography Project – Walt Lerian biography by T. Scott Brandon

1903 births
1929 deaths
Major League Baseball catchers
Philadelphia Phillies players
Waynesboro Villagers players
York White Roses players
Birmingham Barons players
New Haven Profs players
Baseball players from Baltimore
Road incident deaths in Maryland
Pedestrian road incident deaths